Walter Herbert may refer to:
 Wally Herbert (1934-2007), British polar explorer
 Walter Herbert (conductor) (1898-1975), American conductor and impresario
 Walter Herbert (manager) (1948-2021), American manager of the band Journey
 Walter Herbert (by 1517-64 or later), MP for Breconshire 1558
 Walter Herbert (of St Julian's) (1509–1550), MP for Monmouthshire (UK Parliament constituency),1545

See also